Hamel is an unincorporated community in Medina, Hennepin County, Minnesota, United States.  Hamel has its own fire station  and post office with ZIP code 55340.

The area was platted as a city as early as 1879, but efforts to incorporate failed, in part, because of the complication of the town straddling the borders of both Medina Township and Plymouth Township.  The post office in Hamel serves both the northern portion of Medina and the southern area of Corcoran, Minnesota.

References

Geography of Hennepin County, Minnesota
Neighborhoods in Minnesota